The Alphabet Synthesis Machine (2002) is a work of interactive art which makes use of genetic algorithms to "evolve" a set of glyphs similar in appearance to a real-world alphabet. Users create initial glyphs and the program takes over. As the creators of the project put it, their goal was "to bring about the specific feeling of semi-sense one experiences when one recognizes—- but cannot read—- the unfamiliar writing of another culture." The project was developed by Golan Levin, a new-media artist, in collaboration with Cassidy Curtis and Jonathan Feinberg.

Notes

References
 https://www.pbs.org/art21/series/seasonone/online.html (PBS and Art21 commissioned the work)
 http://www.flong.com/storage/pdf/reports/alphabet_report.pdf (White paper by artists that describes the work in detail)
 https://web.archive.org/web/20071027165630/http://www.ciac.ca/magazine/archives/no_19/en/entrevue.htm (Interview with Golan Levin by CIAC's Electronic Magazine)

External links
 http://www.alphabetsynthesis.com/ (and a project page composed by Golan Levin)(link does not work)
 https://web.archive.org/web/20080513044335/http://www.alphabetsynthesis.com/ (Archived version of previous link)
 http://www.users.globalnet.co.uk/~ngo/font0000.htm (examples of fonts produced by the Machine)
 http://www.tug.org/TUGboat/Articles/tb26-1/tb82beet.pdf (brief mention in TUGboat)

Computer art